Paul Carell was the post-war pen name of Paul Karl Schmidt (2 November 1911 – 20 June 1997) who was a writer and German propagandist. During the Nazi era, Schmidt served as the chief press spokesman for Joachim von Ribbentrop's Foreign Ministry. In this capacity during World War II, he maintained close ties with the Wehrmacht, while he served in the Allgemeine-SS (General SS). One of his specialities was the "Jewish question". After the war, Carell became a successful author whose books romanticized and whitewashed the Wehrmacht.

Career before and during World War II 
Born in Kelbra, Paul Karl Schmidt became a member of the Nazi Party in 1931 and a member of the SS in 1938. He graduated from university in 1934, and became an assistant at the Institute of Psychology of the University of Kiel in Germany. He held several positions in the Nazi Student Association.

In the SS, Schmidt was promoted to the rank of Obersturmbannführer in 1940. During the same year, he became the chief press spokesman for foreign minister Joachim von Ribbentrop. In this position, he was responsible for the German Foreign Ministry's news and press division.

Schmidt chaired the daily press conferences of the ministry, and was thus one of the most important and influential propagandists for Nazism during World War II. Recent studies confirm that his influence was at least on the same level as that of Otto Dietrich (Reichspressechef of Adolf Hitler) and of Hans Fritzsche (Pressechef of the Reichspropagandaministerium). Schmidt was also responsible  for the German propaganda magazine Signal, which was published in several languages to tell the German side of the story in neutral and occupied countries during the war.

Schmidt justified the Holocaust through his propaganda efforts. In May 1944, he gave advice on how to justify the deportation and murder of Hungarian Jews, to counter the potential accusation of mass murder: 

Schmidt was arrested on 6 May 1945 and interned for 30 months. It was left open for a long time whether he would appear as one of those indicted, or as a witness for the prosecution, during the war crimes trials. During the Ministries Trial, part of the Nuremberg Trials, he finally appeared as a witness for the prosecution, and portrayed himself as a fighter for democratic freedom of the press.

Post-war 
After World War II, Schmidt became a writer. Aided by the network of 'old comrades' working in the publishing industry, he was able to secure assignments. Starting in the 1950s, he wrote for the popular magazine Kristall.  He first used the pseudonym Paul Karell, and later Paul Carell.

He worked as a freelance author under various noms de plume for newspapers such as Die Welt and Die Zeit (as P. C. Holm, among others). He also wrote for the magazines Norddeutsche Rundschau and Der Spiegel, and published some accounts of war stories for Der Landser, a West German pulp magazine featuring stories predominantly set during World War II. He was seen as an influential adviser to the German Axel Springer AG, where he wrote speeches for Axel Springer.

From 1965 to 1971 the Office of the State Prosecutor of Verden in Germany investigated him for murder. But the investigation, which some claim should have clarified his role in the genocide of Hungarian Jews, ended without an indictment. Schmidt never had to face a trial for his activities during the war.

In 1992 Carell claimed that even after the Battle of Stalingrad there was a possibility for Germany to win the war. In his view, it was primarily the command of Adolf Hitler that led to the defeat. The leadership of the Wehrmacht and very competent commanders such as Erich von Manstein could have achieved victory if not for Hitler's interference. Carell also claimed that the invasion of the Soviet Union was a preemptive attack to forestall an invasion of Germany by the Red Army.

Writing career

The success of his books Hitler Moves East (Unternehmen Barbarossa) and Scorched Earth (Verbrannte Erde) made Carell a leading post-war chronicler of the German side of World War II on the Eastern Front. His book Die Gefangenen (1980), dealing with German prisoners of war in the Soviet Union, was published by Ullstein-Verlag. These books generally had a positive media reception; Die Welt wrote, for example: "Helps to reduce the dislike between Germans and Russians (...) qualified as an historian." Or the : "Someone for whom the seriousness of the source and the value of documentation are more important than going for cheap thrills – that is Paul Carell!" Carell also wrote about Rommel and about the Allied invasion of Normandy.

In his books, Carell portrays the Wehrmacht as heroes fighting for a lost cause. Carell presents, according to his critics, a post-war revisionist message, first popularized by leading Wehrmacht generals:
The German soldier fought a clean war imposed on him by an evil dictator (there is no mention of the war of aggression and annihilation, which the war in the East really was).
The Waffen-SS appear as soldiers just like all the rest.
In the end, the overwhelming material and human resources of the enemy defeat the Germans.

Critics point out that Carell's works emphasize the German army's professionalism, sacrifice and positive encounters with civilians, and his books also suggest that the Wehrmacht freed the Russians from their Communist tyrants and restored their religious community.

Critics also suggest that in Carell's works the army thus operated in a world distinct from the political sphere, and the culprits for any calamities that befell the Russian people rule this political sphere, namely the Nazi and the Communist parties. The thrust of this argument thus confirmed the high moral position of the German officer, perpetuating the myth of the "clean Wehrmacht". Carell's themes of anti-Communism also appealed to the U.S. public and garnered Carell repeat reprints.

Bibliography
Stalingrad: The Defeat of the German 6th Army. Atglen, PA: Schiffer Military History, 1993 
Hitler's War on Russia, volume 2 Scorched Earth. London: Harrap, 1970  
Hitler Moves East: 1941-1943. New York: Little, Brown, 1964  
Invasion! They're Coming!. New York: Dutton, 1963  
Foxes of the Desert. New York: Bantam, 1960

References

Citations

Bibliography
 (German) Christian Plöger: Von Ribbentrop zu Springer. Zu Leben und Wirken von Paul Karl Schmidt alias Paul Carell. Marburg 2009,  (= doctoral thesis Universität Münster 2009)
  Wigbert Benz: Paul Carell. Ribbentrops Pressechef Paul Karl Schmidt vor und nach 1945. Berlin 2005. 
  Peter Longerich: Propagandisten im Krieg. Die Presseabteilung des Auswärtigen Amtes unter Ribbentrop. München 1987 (ausführlich über Schmidts Tätigkeit im AA - nicht eingesehen)

External links
 
 Biographie bei Shoa.de
 Book Review on Shoa.de 
 Discussion and Documentation of Schmidt/Carell's role relating to deportation and murder of Hungarian Jews
 

1911 births
1997 deaths
University of Kiel alumni
People from Mansfeld-Südharz
German newspaper journalists
Nazi Party politicians
SS-Obersturmbannführer
Nazi propagandists
Prisoners and detainees of the United States military
German prisoners and detainees
German non-fiction writers
People from the Province of Saxony
German male non-fiction writers
Bild people
Die Welt people
20th-century non-fiction writers
20th-century pseudonymous writers